Soulmates is the second album from American singer and actor Joey Lawrence. It was released in 1997 on Curb Records.  Unlike his debut album, Joey Lawrence, he featured in the production and co-wrote nine of the songs (the tenth track was self-penned).

Track listing
Arrangements By Steve Goldstein, Joey Lawrence, Steve LeGassick, Michael Price & Jim Sitterly.
 "Never Gonna Change My Mind" (Joey Lawrence, Steve Real) 4:29
 "Ven Ven Conmigo"  (Translation: Come, Come With Me) (Lawrence, Real) 4:25
 "Soulmates" (Lawrence, Steve LeGassick, Michael Price) 4:16
 "Timeless" (Lawrence, LeGassick, Price, Real) 4:47
 "Me & You" (Lawrence) 4:42
 "Cypress Park (All Good People)" (Lawrence, LeGassick, Price) 4:08
 "I Wish It Could Be Me" (Lawrence, LeGassick, Price, Real) 4:19
 "So Much Pain" (Lawrence, Real) 4:28
 "If You Wanna Get Down" (Lawrence, Real) 3:36
 "Time" (Lawrence, Real, Dane Bryant) 3:11

Personnel
Joey Lawrence: Lead Vocal
Steve Barri: Electric & Acoustic Guitars, Bass, Keyboards, Drum Programming
Steve Carnelli: Electric & Acoustic Guitars
Steve Goldstein: Keyboards, Programming
Steve LeGassick: Electric & Acoustic Guitars, Bass, Keyboards, Drum Programming
Michael Price: Electric & Acoustic Guitars, Bass, Keyboards, Drum Programming
Brian Ray: Electric & Acoustic Guitars
Machito Sanchez: Percussion
John Schreiner: Keyboards, Programming
Matt Lawrence, Joseph Powell, Steve Real, Julia Waters, Oren Waters, Maxine Willard-Waters, Yvonne Williams: Backing Vocals

Production
Produced By Steve Barri, Joey Lawrence & Steve Goldstein
Recorded & Engineered By Bryan Campbell & Leon Johnson
Assistant Engineers: Jeffrey Shannon, Brett Swain, Brian Young
Mixing: Leon Johnson
Re-Mixing: Bryan Campbell, Steve Goldstein

References

1997 albums
Curb Records albums
Dance-pop albums by American artists